Highway 965 is a provincial highway in the north-west region of the Canadian province of Saskatchewan. It runs from Highway 903 to Highway 155.

Highway 965 also intersects the Cole Bay Access Road and the Canoe Narrows Access Road. It passes through the Canoe Lake Cree First Nation as well as the town of Jans Bay.

Highway 965 was originally designated as Highway 101, but was renumbered in the early 1980s as part of the establishment of the 900-series highways.

See also
Roads in Saskatchewan
Transportation in Saskatchewan

References

965